Ulrich Büscher (born 20 October 1958) is a German former football player.

Career 

In 1977, he played for Arminia Bielefeld, then spent six months with VfL Osnabrück in 1979 before returning to Arminia Bielefeld. He played 91 games and scored two goals in the Bundesliga, played 35 games in the 2. Bundesliga and played 76 games with 3 goals in the 2. Bundesliga North.

Achievements 

 2. Bundesliga: 1977–78, 1979–80

References

External links
 

German footballers
Arminia Bielefeld players
Living people
1958 births
Bundesliga players
2. Bundesliga players
Sportspeople from Bielefeld
Association football defenders
Footballers from North Rhine-Westphalia